Yankeetown (also Yankee Town) is an unincorporated community in White County, Tennessee, United States.

Notes

Unincorporated communities in White County, Tennessee
Unincorporated communities in Tennessee